Lifestyle gurus (also called lifestyle coaches, lifestyle trainers, lifestyle consultants) trained people to understand how they can make themselves happier through changes in their lifestyle. Lifestyle gurus are a profession popularised by several celebrities, including Cherie Blair and Madonna in the 1990s and 2000s.

Prominent examples of lifestyle gurus include Carole Caplin, who worked as a lifestyle guru for the Blair family.

Criticism
Lifestyle gurus have come under heavy criticism in recent years, with most criticisms concerning their utility. Other criticisms have centred on the perception that they are a symptom of the indecisiveness of today's society.

Frank Furedi, a professor of sociology at the University of Kent, has been a prominent critic of lifestyle gurus. Lifestyle gurus have received criticism for preaching unscientific ideas and thus influencing public opinion.

A 2017 article in Vox accused personal-growth gurus of being "all smoke and mirrors", "a hypocrite's game", and "bullshit artistry" aimed at making money from selling a product, such as books or conferences.

See also
Life coaching
Motivational speaker
Peer support specialist

References

Life coaching
Lifestyle